Roman Alekseyevich Eremenko (born 19 March 1987) is a professional footballer who plays as an attacking midfielder.

Eremenko is best known for his time at Dynamo Kyiv, winning the Ukrainian Premier League title in 2009, and playing in the Champions League and Europa League. He served a two-year ban for cocaine use from October 2016 to October 2018.

Prior to his ban, Eremenko also played regularly for the Finland national team. He made his international debut in June 2007 at the age of 20, having moved to Finland from Russia as a child.

Club career

Jaro
Eremenko's career on senior level started when he made his Veikkausliiga debut for Jaro in 2004 at the age of 17 when coach Hannu Touru used him as a substitute in a match against MYPA on 29 June 2004. In that match Eremenko appeared on the pitch at the same time with his father Alexei Eremenko Sr. who played for the whole match as a midfielder. Eremenko scored his first goal on senior level on 18 September 2004 in a match against FC Lahti. He made six appearances for Jaro in his first season. During season 2004 he was also loaned to Finnish Second Division club Jakobstads BK and to Finnish First Division club GBK Kokkola. He made his break through in Jaro during season 2005 when he became a regular in the starting eleven. He gained 13 caps and was in the starting line-up 10 times. In those 13 matches he scored two goals.

Udinese
In the summer of 2005 Eremenko signed a five-year deal with Udinese. He made his Serie A debut on the first day of the 2006–07 season against Messina. He became the fourth Finnish footballer after Mika Aaltonen, Mika Lehkosuo and his brother Alexei Eremenko Jr to make an appearance in a Serie A match. He was loaned to A.C. Siena on 31 January 2007, where he played 11 games. During the summer of 2007 he returned to Udinese.

In October 2007, Eremenko, Andrea Dossena, Cristián Zapata, and Simone Pepe were awarded new contracts until June 2012.

Dynamo Kyiv
In August 2008, he was loaned to FC Dynamo Kyiv, until 31 May 2009. On 22 May 2009, he signed permanently with Dynamo Kyiv until 2014. During his three years at Dynamo, Eremenko established himself as one of the leaders of the team.

Eremenko debuted in the Champions League on 17 September 2008, in a home game against Arsenal FC. That week, he also scored his first goal in the Ukrainian Premier League, netting a pass from Tiberiu Ghioane on the 8th minute of a game against Chornomorets Odessa. Eremenko scored his first goal in the Champions League on 10 December 2008 on Fenerbahçe.

During the 2009–10 season, he took part in a total of 35 official matches for Dynamo, 26 of which were in the Ukrainian championship, and scored 1 goal.

In the 2010–11 season, besides continuing his successful performance for Dynamo domestically, Eremenko became the top assistant of the Europa League.

After a total of three years of playing for Dynamo, Eremenko played in a total of 127 official games, and scored seven goals. He also won the 2008–09 Ukrainian Premier League, and the Ukrainian Super Cups in 2009 and 2011.

Rubin Kazan
In the last stages of the summer transfer window in 2011, Eremenko signed with Russian club Rubin Kazan for a reported fee of 13M €, which is the highest transfer fee ever paid for a Finnish player. His older brother Alexei also signed a contract with Rubin Kazan in August 2011. On 26 November Roman scored his first goal for Rubin, in a 2–0 home victory over Dynamo Moscow.

On 9 May 2012, he scored the game's only goal in the Russian Cup final.

CSKA Moscow
After leaving Rubin Kazan in the summer of 2014, Eremenko signed a four-year contract with PFC CSKA Moscow on 25 August 2014. He was selected as the Best Player of October and December 2014 and March 2015 in the Russian Football Premier League. He won the Russian Football Premier League MVP of the season 2014–15 award.

On 6 October 2016, Finland announced that Eremenko had been handed a 30-day ban from football by UEFA. On 18 November 2016, UEFA announced that Roman had been handed a two-year ban from UEFA competitions due to testing positive for cocaine. In December 2016, FIFA extended Eremenko's ban to all football competitions. His appeal was rejected by UEFA and the ban was upheld on 6 March 2017.

Spartak Moscow
On 10 August 2018, Eremenko signed with FC Spartak Moscow, joining his younger brother Sergei at the team. His father Alexei Eremenko Sr. also played for Spartak. His disqualification expired on 6 October 2018 and he made his debut on 7 October against Yenisey Krasnoyarsk. Spartak released him from his contract on 8 January 2019.

Rostov
On 18 January 2019, FC Rostov announced the signing of Eremenko on a 2.5-year contract. Rostov (called FC Rostselmash at the time) was the first club of Roman's father, Alexei Eremenko Sr. In his third game for Rostov on 16 March 2019, he scored twice in the last 10 minutes to give his club a 2–0 away victory over Rubin Kazan.

On 14 June 2019, Rostov announced that Eremenko had extended his contract with the club for four years. On 23 February 2021, Eremenko left Rostov by mutual consent.

HIFK 
On 28 July 2022, Eremenko joined Veikkausliiga club HIFK for the rest of the 2022 season.

International career
Eremenko made his international debut in the Finland national team at Helsinki Olympic Stadium on 6 June 2007 in a UEFA Euro 2008 qualification match against Belgium when Roy Hodgson chose him to the starting line up. The game was interrupted for six minutes after a Eurasian eagle-owl intruded the playing pitch. This incident earned the Finland team their current nickname, The Eagle Owls. Eremenko has been a regular member for Finland ever since and he was a key player in Finland's qualification campaigns for 2010 FIFA World Cup, UEFA Euro 2012, 2014 FIFA World Cup and UEFA Euro 2016. He scored his first goal for Finland from penalty spot on 3 March 2010 in a friendly match against Malta.

Personal life
Roman Eremenko is married to Marika Eremenko and has three children. Eremenko moved to Finland with his family at the age of three when his father, former FC Dynamo Moscow and FC Spartak Moscow player Alexei Eremenko Sr., came to play in Finland with FF Jaro. He was granted Finnish citizenship in 2003, but still holds a Russian passport as well, Eremenko is the younger brother of Alexei Eremenko Jr and the older brother of Sergei Eremenko. His father took over as manager in Jaro in August 2009.

In 2016 he was suspended for two years because of doping after failing a doping test. He tested positive for cocaine based on a sample done by UEFA.

Career statistics

Club

International

Scores and results list Finland's goal tally first, score column indicates score after each Eremenko goal.

Honours
Dynamo Kyiv
Ukrainian Premier League: 2008–09
Ukrainian Super Cup: 2009, 2011

Rubin Kazan
Russian Cup: 2011–12
Russian Super Cup: 2012

CSKA Moscow
Russian Premier League: 2015–16

Individual
Finnish Football Association Player of the Year: 2011, 2014
Finnish Sports' Journalists Player of the Year: 2011, 2014, 2015
UEFA Europa League most assists leading to a goal in tournament phase: 2010–11
Russian League MVP of the season: 2014–15
Russian Premier League Player of the Month: October 2014, December 2014, March 2015

References

External links

 
 
 
 
 
 
 
 
 
 
 

1987 births
Living people
Footballers from Moscow
Russian footballers
Finnish footballers
Finland international footballers
Finnish expatriate footballers
Expatriate footballers in Italy
Expatriate footballers in Ukraine
Finnish expatriate sportspeople in Italy
Finnish expatriate sportspeople in Ukraine
Association football midfielders
Udinese Calcio players
A.C.N. Siena 1904 players
Veikkausliiga players
Serie A players
Ukrainian Premier League players
FC Dynamo Kyiv players
FF Jaro players
Russian-speaking Finns
Finnish people of Russian descent
Finnish people of Ukrainian descent
Russian people of Ukrainian descent
Russian Premier League players
Soviet emigrants to Finland
FC Rubin Kazan players
Expatriate footballers in Russia
PFC CSKA Moscow players
FC Spartak Moscow players
FC Rostov players
HIFK Fotboll players
Doping cases in association football
Finnish sportspeople in doping cases
Russian sportspeople in doping cases
Naturalized citizens of Finland
GBK Kokkola players